Serghei Marghiev (born 6 November 1992) is a Moldovan athlete specialising in the hammer throw. He competed for Moldova at the 2012 Summer Olympics.

Born in Russia, he is the younger brother of fellow hammer throwers, Zalina Marghieva and Marina Nikişenko.

Competition record

References

Moldovan male hammer throwers
Athletes (track and field) at the 2012 Summer Olympics
Athletes (track and field) at the 2016 Summer Olympics
Olympic athletes of Moldova
1992 births
Living people
World Athletics Championships athletes for Moldova
Athletes (track and field) at the 2015 European Games
European Games competitors for Moldova
Russian emigrants to Moldova
People from Vladikavkaz
Universiade medalists in athletics (track and field)
Universiade bronze medalists for Moldova
Competitors at the 2013 Summer Universiade
Competitors at the 2015 Summer Universiade
Medalists at the 2017 Summer Universiade
Athletes (track and field) at the 2020 Summer Olympics